The Journal of Medical Engineering & Technology is a peer-reviewed medical journal covering medical engineering and related subjects. It is published by Taylor & Francis and the editor -in-chief is John P. Woodcock (University Hospital of Wales). The journal is abstracted and indexed in Scopus.

References

External links

Biomedical engineering journals
Publications established in 1977
Taylor & Francis academic journals
English-language journals